Addgene is a non-profit plasmid repository. Addgene facilitates the exchange of genetic material between laboratories by offering plasmids and their associated cloning data to not-for-profit laboratories around the world. Addgene provides a free online database of plasmid cloning information and references, including lists of commonly used vector backbones, popular lentiviral plasmids and molecular cloning protocols.

History
Addgene was founded in 2004, by Melina Fan, Kenneth Fan and Benjie Chen.

Operations 
Addgene's headquarters are located in Watertown, Massachusetts.

Addgene accepts plasmids from researchers for distribution and archival. Addgene obtains revenues and licensing fees using the free depository for commercial sale, and is selective at will in selling acquired depository plasmids to 501 (c) 3 nonprofit organizations at the industrial price for profit gains for its putative non-profit operation.

The organization covers the operating costs of maintaining and improving the collection by charging a nominal fee to scientists requesting plasmids.

Plasmid repository 
As of 2014 Addgene's repository comprised 30,000 plasmids, deposited by 1,700 labs. Its plasmid collection contains plasmids used for functions such as  genome engineering (including CRISPRS), gene expression, shRNA knockdown, viral-mediated gene delivery, detection of miRNA and promoter activity. The plasmid collection includes:

 Genome engineering
 CRISPRs
 Transcription Activator-Like Effector Nuclease (TALEN) kits
 Zinc finger nuclease kits
 Empty backbones
 Species-specific expression
 Epitope tags
 Fusion proteins
 Selectable markers
 Fluorescent marker
 Viral vectors
 Retroviral/Lentiviral
 Adenoviral
 AAV
 cDNA expression
 shRNA expression

Tools and guides

Molecular biology tools

Vector Database—A curated list of over 4,000 vector backbones, including relevant cloning information and bacterial growth conditions.

Sequence Analyzer—An Addgene software tool  for creating plasmid maps from sequences with annotated features and restriction sites.

Molecular Biology Reference—A collection of references for molecular biology reagents, such as primers, restriction enzymes and antibiotic concentrations.

Plasmid Cloning Guides

Molecular Cloning Guides—References to help scientists design plasmid cloning experiments, including tutorials on restriction enzyme digestion and PCR-based cloning.

Molecular Cloning Protocols—Specific protocols for a variety of plasmid cloning techniques, such as isolation of bacterial colonies, DNA purification by gel electrophoresis and bacterial transformation.

Collaborations

Addgene collaborates with institutes and consortia to curate plasmid collections for specific purposes. Examples of these collaborations include special collections from the Structural Genomics Consortium, Zinc Finger Consortium, the Cell Migration Consortium, the KLF collection and The Michael J. Fox Foundation.  The plasmids are available to both academic and industry labs.

Depositors
Noteworthy depositors include:
12 Nobel Prize winners; John Gurdon, Shinya Yamanaka, Bruce Beutler, Mario Capecchi, Andrew Fire, Richard Axel, Eric Wieschaus, Phillip Sharp, Robert Lefkowitz, Martin Chalfie, Roger Tsien and Johann Deisenhofer.
8 Breakthrough Prize in Life Sciences winners; Cori Bargmann, David Botstein, Lewis C. Cantley, Hans Clevers, Titia de Lange, Bert Vogelstein, Robert Weinberg and Shinya Yamanaka.

Electronic Material Transfer Agreements

Addgene requires Material Transfer Agreements (MTAs) for all materials transferred through Addgene to protect the intellectual property of plasmid depositors. Addgene developed one of the first electronic systems for handling MTAs.  By using the standard Universal Biological Material Transfer Agreement (UBMTA) and implementing electronic signatures, Addgene’s electronic MTA (eMTA) system expedites the approval process for plasmid orders.

Awards
Addgene won awards for innovation and research including Mass Nonprofit Network Award for excellence in Innovations, Cambridge award program 2014 Award for Research & Development Laboratories, Mass Technology Leadership Award Finalist 2012.

References

External links

Other plasmid repositories 
BCCM/LMBP
BIOSS Toolbox
PSI DNASU
Harvard PlasmID

Gene banks
Biotechnology databases
Non-profit organizations based in Massachusetts
2004 establishments in Massachusetts